Macon County may refer to:

United States
 Macon County, Alabama
 Macon County, Georgia
 Macon County, Illinois
 Macon County, Missouri
 Macon County, North Carolina
 Macon County Airport
 Macon County, Tennessee

Medieval France
 County of Mâcon

See also
 
 Macon County Line, a 1974 film
 Return to Macon County a 1975 sequel